Autumnal Park is the debut studio album by Australian new wave band Pseudo Echo. Autumnal Park peaked at No. 11 in Australia and produced two Top 20 singles, including "Listening", which peaked at No. 4 in Australia. It was released in North America under the title, Pseudo Echo. The song "His Eyes" also appeared in the film Friday the 13th Part V: A New Beginning.

At the 1984 Countdown Music Awards, the album was nominated for Best Debut Album.

Background
Pseudo Echo was formed in 1982 in Melbourne by school friends Brian Canham and Pierre Gigliotti, joining Anthony Argiro and Tony Lugton. They played around Melbourne and were discovered by Molly Meldrum, a television presenter for the pop-music series Countdown. Meldrum convinced them to perform on the show, on which they performed a demo version of "Listening" in June 1983. Shortly after, they were signed to EMI Australia and "Listening" reached No. 4. Autumnal Park was released in June 1984.

Reviews
AllMusic gave the album 4.5/5 stars; reviewer Michael Sutton said: "Pseudo Echo hit the jackpot, finding mercilessly catchy grooves and then running with it. These tracks explode from the speakers with breathless energy, bombarding the listener with rapid-fire hooks. The lyrics lack depth, but they aren't intended for in-depth analysis. The songs are made for dancing, and Pseudo Echo approach every track with unyielding enthusiasm. Pseudo Echo is a sadly underappreciated effort, usually dismissed by critics unable to feel the warmth beneath the group's jubilant, synthesized pop."

Track listing
Vinyl/cassette

CD release (2005)

Tracks 1 & 12-14 are bonus tracks.

Charts

Personnel
Pierre Pierre - bass, keyboards, vocals
Anthony Johan Argiro - drums, percussion
Tony Lugton - keyboards, vocals
Brian Canham - vocals, guitar, keyboards
Technical
Glen Phimister - engineer
Guy Gray, Jim Taig, Peter Cobbin - sound effects

References

External links

1984 debut albums
EMI Records albums
Albums produced by John Punter
Pseudo Echo albums
Albums produced by Peter Dawkins (musician)